Samuel Hugh Moffett (April 7, 1916 – February 9, 2015) was an American Christian missionary and academic who latterly served as professor emeritus at the Princeton Theological Seminary. He was regarded as a leading scholar on Christianity in Asia, and was the author of numerous publications, including the two-volume series of A History of Christianity in Asia.

Biography
Born and raised on the Korean Peninsula, Moffett's parents were missionaries in Pyongyang (now the capital of North Korea) when he was born in 1916. His father, Samuel Austin Moffett, lived and worked in Pyongyang from 1890 to 1936.

Moffett followed in his parents footsteps, both in his spiritual life and his regional work. After graduating from Wheaton College and Princeton Theological Seminary in 1942, he completed a Ph.D. in history at Yale University. He began a career in the ministry, and later returned to Princeton as a faculty member at the Seminary from 1953–1955. In 1955, he and his new wife Eileen moved to South Korea to work as missionaries, beginning in the rural area of Andong. He remained a professor and dean of the graduate school with Princeton, and became the co-president of the Korean Presbyterian Seminary. While in Korea, he was appointed the director of the Asian Center for Theological Studies and Mission from 1974 to 1981. Following that, he returned to the campus of his alma mater, Princeton Theological Seminary, as Henry Winters Luce Professor of Ecumenics and Mission from 1981–1987.

Moffett died at his home in Princeton, New Jersey on February 9, 2015 at the age of 98.

Works 

 Moffett, Samuel H. (1998). A History of Christianity in Asia: Vol. I: Beginnings to 1500. Orbis Books. 
 Moffett, Samuel H. (2005). A History of Christianity in Asia: Vol II: 1500-1900. Orbis Books.

References

1916 births
2015 deaths
American historians of religion
American male non-fiction writers
American Presbyterian missionaries
People from Pyongyang
Presbyterian missionaries in South Korea